Venus of Venice is a 1927 silent film romantic comedy directed by Marshall Neilan and starring Constance Talmadge and Antonio Moreno. Talmadge's own production unit produced with distribution through First National Pictures.

Cast
Constance Talmadge - Carlotta
Antonio Moreno - Kenneth
Julanne Johnston - Jean
Edward Martindel - Journalist
Michael Vavitch - Marco
Arthur Thalasso - Ludvico
Andre Lanoy - Giuseppe
Carmelita Geraghty - Bride
Mario Carillo - Bridegroom
Tom Ricketts - Bride's father
Hedda Hopper - Jean's mother

Preservation status
With the exception of one lost reel, the film survives. Prints held at UCLA Film and Television Archive and George Eastman House Motion Picture Collection.

References

External links
 Venus of Venice at IMDb.com

1927 films
American silent feature films
First National Pictures films
Films directed by Marshall Neilan
1927 romantic comedy films
American black-and-white films
1920s English-language films
American romantic comedy films
1920s American films
Silent romantic comedy films
Silent American comedy films